The 1984–85 Scottish Second Division was won by Montrose who, along with second placed Alloa Athletic, were promoted to the First Division. Arbroath finished bottom.

Table

References 

Scottish Second Division seasons
3
Scot